Operation Devi Shakti was an operation of the Indian Armed Forces to evacuate Indian citizens and foreign nationals from Afghanistan after the collapse of the Islamic Republic of Afghanistan and the fall of Kabul, the capital city, to the Taliban.

Background 

The Taliban and allied militant groups began a widespread offensive on 1 May 2021, concurrent with the withdrawal of most U.S. troops from Afghanistan.

Kabul airlift 

India has evacuated over 800 people amid a deteriorating security situation in Kabul.

 On 16 August, 40 Indians were airlifted from Kabul to Delhi.

 168 people, including 107 Indians and 23 Afghan Sikhs and Hindus, were flown from Kabul to Hindan Air Force Station near Delhi in a C-17 Globemaster III heavy-lift military transport aircraft of the Indian Air Force.

 87 Indians and two Nepalese nationals were brought back in a special Air India flight from Dushanbe, a day after they were evacuated to the Tajikistan capital in an Indian Air Force C-130J transport aircraft.

 On 21 August, 78 people, including 25 Indians and a number of Afghan Sikhs and Hindus from Dushanbe, a day after they were evacuated from Kabul to the Tajik city.

See also 
 Afghanistan–India relations
1990 airlift of Indians from Kuwait
 Operation Ganga
 Operation Raahat
 Operation Allies Refuge
 Operation Pitting
 Operation Miracle (2021)

References 

Non-combat military operations involving India
2021 in India
Evacuations of Indians
Airlifts
History of the foreign relations of India
Indian diaspora in Asia
2021 in aviation
Aviation history of India
Modi administration
Afghanistan–India relations
Non-combatant evacuation operations
War in Afghanistan (2001–2021)